The Good News Network is an American online newspaper which publishes positive news stories.

Overview
The website was launched in 1997 by Geri Weis-Corbley in order to publish uplifting news gathered from sources around the world. It attempts to share positive and encouraging stories, as well as breakthroughs in technology and health. Weis-Corbley says that it is a "clearinghouse for the gathering and dissemination of positive, compelling new stories," to promote a well-balanced perspective.

In an article about Weis-Corbley, Tal Ben-Shahar, an expert on positive psychology and Harvard University lecturer, said that our perception of the world is warped by continual viewing of bad news. "While the media focuses on a small number of frauds—which it should certainly report on—it entirely ignores the millions or billions of honest transactions that take place every day... Too many people, assisted by the media bias, extrapolate from a few cases of people hurting others that human nature is bad."

Content
It publishes stories and shares videos and news from mainstream media, like NBC and CNN. Topics include health, environment, USA, world, business, culture, kids, pets, and celebrities. The site also publishes original content from authors and columnists, such as Desmond Tutu, David Ignatius, Jeanne Marie Laskas, David Suzuki and Karen Armstrong.

An example of a positive story was one from 2009 about the kinds of jobs being created in solar and wind energy industries due to a stimulus package. It tackles how positive reinforcement is meaningful, such as when a Canadian police department gives out positive tickets to citizens.

The staff published its 18,000th news story in January 2017.

Readership
The site experiences increased traffic following difficult events, like the September 11 attacks.
There was also a 45% increase in readership when the bank bailouts began in 2008.

GoodNewsNetwork's articles are cited in books, such as an article about how United States mayors are embracing the Kyoto Protocol in a book about carbon reduction. GoodNewsNetwork is listed as a resource in the book Positive Psychology: The Science of Happiness and Flourishing, by William C. Compton and Edward Hoffman, which was published in 2012.

Funding
The company earns its revenue from online advertising on the site. Readers may also become members by contributing donations of between $2.00 - $500, and receive bonus downloadable gifts as a thank-you.

In popular culture
 Mentioned in Deadly Charm: An Amanda Bell Brown Mystery published in 2009 by Claudia Mair Burney.

See also
Positive News
Positivity effect
Yes! (U.S. magazine)

References

External links
 GoodNewsNetwork's official website

Internet properties established in 1997
American news websites